Darlington is a locality in the Western District of Victoria, Australia. Mount Emu Creek passes through the locality .

The locality has one remaining pub, the Elephant Bridge Hotel. The Elephant Bridge Hotel is believed to be one of the oldest continuously licensed pubs in Victoria. The kitchen and cellar were built in 1842 and the rest of the building some years later. The pub claims to have four resident ghosts.

References

Towns in Victoria (Australia)
Shire of Corangamite